William H. Allen and Company (est. 1835) was a bookselling and publishing business in London, England, at first known for issuing works related to the British colonies. It operated from headquarters in Leadenhall Street, later moving to Waterloo Place. Early owners and staff included James P. Allen, William Ferneley Allen (d. 1877), and William Houghton Allen.

After a series of acquisitions, the W. H. Allen name disappeared in 1991.

History 

By 1975 W. H. Allen was part of the British conglomerate Howard & Wyndham Ltd. During 1977 and 1978 the Wyndham identity was phased out, with the whole publishing line being identified with the W. H. Allen brand. The Target Books paperback line became well known for its highly successful range of novelisations and other assorted books based on the popular science fiction television series Doctor Who.

In 1977, W. H. Allen acquired Warner Communications' publishing division, including Williams Publishing and Thorpe & Porter; but by 1978–1979 W. H. Allen decided to close down both divisions.

W. H. Allen was acquired by Virgin Books in a process that spanned late 1986 to late 1987. Virgin Books was incorporated into W. H. Allen in 1989, but in 1991 W. H. Allen was renamed Virgin Publishing Ltd. Random House, through its United Kingdom division, acquired a 90% stake in Virgin Books in March 2007. In November 2009, Virgin became an independent imprint within Ebury Publishing, a division of the Random House Group.

Predecessors
 Black, Kingsbury, and Parbury
 Black, Kingsbury, Parbury and Allen, 1818–1822
 Kingsbury, Parbury, and Allen, 1822–1827 (William Houghton Allen, Thomas Kingsbury, Charles Parbury)
 Parbury, Allen, and Co., 1827–1834 (William Houghton Allen, Charles Parbury)
 Parbury and Allen

See also
 George Parbury

References

Bibliography
issued by the firm
 Asiatic Journal

 Catalogs
 
 A grammar of the Hindūstānī or Urdū language
 Oxford University
 the New York Public Library
 Dictionaries
 

Publishing companies based in London
Publishing companies established in 1835
1835 establishments in England